What to Expect When You're Expecting is a 2012 American romantic comedy film directed by Kirk Jones and distributed by Lionsgate. It was written by Shauna Cross and Heather Hach and is based on Heidi Murkoff's 1984 pregnancy guide of the same name. Its story follows the lives of five couples as their lives are turned upside down by the difficulties and surprises of parenthood. It stars Cameron Diaz, Jennifer Lopez, Elizabeth Banks, Chace Crawford, Brooklyn Decker, Ben Falcone, Anna Kendrick, Matthew Morrison, Dennis Quaid, Chris Rock and Rodrigo Santoro.

The film was released on May 18, 2012 and grossed $84 million worldwide while receiving mixed reviews from critics.

Plot

Prologue

Set in Atlanta, the film opens with TV fitness trainer Jules Baxter and her dance partner Evan Webber performing on the TV show Celebrity Dance Factor. They are crowned the winners of the show, but Jules vomits in their trophy, discovering that she is pregnant.

Jules and Evan 

Jules struggles when trying to balance her pregnancy with her normal active life. After being told during the ultrasound that she is having a son, she has an ongoing argument with Evan over whether or not to have their son circumcised. During labor, she chooses not to have an epidural. She gives birth to a daughter they name Emerson, ending their debate. After giving birth, Jules and Evan get engaged.

Holly and Alex

Photographer Holly Castillo can't conceive children and decides to adopt one from Ethiopia with her husband, Alex. They decide to buy a new house for the baby. Holly sends Alex to hang out with the "dudes group", a group of fathers who walk around the park and support one another, which was founded by Vic Mac. Alex feels even more nervous to become a father. Holly loses her job and becomes hurt when she realizes how much Alex is unprepared for a child. However, they eventually go to Ethiopia and adopt a baby boy named Kaleb.

Wendy and Gary

Wendy Cooper runs a breast feeding boutique called The Breast Choice and has been trying to have a baby with her husband Gary for two years. She eventually does conceive and shares the news with Gary after taking five pregnancy tests.  Having planned a magical and happy pregnancy, Wendy feels awful throughout it and, during a convention she was chosen to speak at about the miracle of childbirth, she begins to break down and begins to rant about the process of pregnancy. Her outburst is filmed and becomes a viral hit on YouTube, after which her boutique is flooded with customers. After many labor-inducing activities, she goes to the hospital only to find out she has to have a cesarean section, which is against her birth plan. She suffers severe blood loss, but survives and delivers a son named Theo.

Skyler and Ramsey

Ramsey Cooper, a famous race car driver, and Gary's father, is married to a much younger woman named Skyler, making her Gary's stepmother. She treats Gary as her own son despite her obviously not being his mother, much to Gary's annoyance. During a brunch where Wendy and Gary announce her pregnancy, Ramsey and Skyler also announce they are expecting. Unlike Wendy, Skyler cruises through her pregnancy without issues. Wendy envies her and detests her ease; however, soon after Skyler gives birth to twin girls, she and Ramsey are shown struggling with the fussy babies.

Rosie and Marco

Rosie Brennan, a food-truck chef, meets an old high school friend, Marco, also a food-truck chef, during a turf war between their food trucks. She believes he is a player and initially blows him off, but the reunion leads to an unexpected pregnancy after sex that night. Worried at first, they eventually adjust to the idea of becoming parents and move in together. However, one night Rosie discovers she is bleeding and they drive to the hospital where they discover she has miscarried. Devastated, Rosie tells Marco to leave, which he does, but he makes several attempts to get back with her. Eventually, they get back together and decide to take things slowly and their story ends with them joining forces to create a food truck together.

Epilogue

At different points in the film, certain characters meet others. Many of the characters are fans of one or both of Jules' two TV series. Gary was on Jules' weight loss program and is a regular customer of Marco's food truck, Skyler is Rosie's cousin, and Holly is Wendy and Skyler's photographer.

Cast 
 Cameron Diaz as Jules, a contestant on a celebrity dance show and a host to a weight-loss fitness show, who becomes pregnant with her dance partner's baby girl named Emerson
 Jennifer Lopez as Holly, a woman who adopts a baby boy named Kaleb from abroad with her unwilling husband after difficulty conceiving
 Elizabeth Banks as Wendy, Gary's wife and Theo's mother who becomes pregnant after trying for 2 years. Runs the Breast Choice Boutique.
 Chace Crawford as Marco, who reunites with an old flame (Rosie) after a turf war between their respective food trucks
 Brooklyn Decker as Skyler, the wife of a much older man named Ramsey, stepmother of Gary who becomes pregnant with twins Laverne & Shirley
 Ben Falcone as Gary, Wendy's husband, Theo's father, son of Ramsey, stepson of Skyler, and half-brother to two half-sisters Laverne & Shirley
 Anna Kendrick as Rosie, who reunites with an old flame (Marco) and fellow food-truck owner and becomes pregnant unexpectedly and has a miscarriage
 Matthew Morrison as Evan, who teams with Jules on a celebrity dance show and the father of her baby girl named Emerson
 Dennis Quaid as Ramsey, the husband of Skyler, father of Gary, Laverne & Shirley, and grandfather of Theo
 Chris Rock as Vic, founder of the "dude group" and father of four.
 Rodrigo Santoro as Alex, Holly's husband who's in the music business and is not ready to have an adopted son named Kaleb 
 Joe Manganiello as Davis
 Rob Huebel as Gabe, a new parent who adjusts to "fatherdom" by bonding with other dads in a city park-based group that is part playgroup, part secret society
 Thomas Lennon as Craig, a father who joins Vic's "dude group"
 Amir Talai as Patel, a father who joins Vic's "dude group"
 Rebel Wilson as Janice, an eccentric employee at The Breast Choice boutique
 Wendi McLendon-Covey as Kara, Holly's co-worker and friend
 Dwyane Wade has a cameo as himself
 Whitney Port has a cameo as herself
 Megan Mullally has a cameo as herself
 Kim Fields as Renee Thompson, social worker who helps out a couple with an adoption
 Jesse Burch as Hutch Davidson
 Mimi Gianopulos as Molly, Rosie's funny roommate who comforts and supports her
 Genesis Rodriguez as Courtney, Rosie's roommate

Production

Development

Written by Heidi Murkoff, What to Expect When You're Expecting is a pregnancy guide released in 1984. It is a top-selling book on The New York Times Best Seller list and is considered one of the most influential books of the past twenty-five years. Additionally, it was dubbed "the bible of American pregnancy" and has sold over 20 million units worldwide. On January 14, 2010, it was announced that Lionsgate had acquired the book's worldwide distribution rights from Phoenix Pictures. Heather Hach, who was nine months pregnant at the time, was hired to write the film's screenplay "based on her pitch", which would follow the story of seven couples who experience the "ups and downs" of preparing for parenthood. David Thwaites produced it alongside Mike Medavoy and Arnie Messer. Alli Shearmur, Lionsgate's President of Motion Picture Productions, said the book is "a brand that knows no boundaries" and they were "excited about this film as the first in a potential franchise". Murkoff said she was excited to see Phoenix Pictures and Lionsgate "bring my baby to life". Medavoy, Messer and Thwaites felt that the book provides the "perfect launching point" to tell a funny story.

Pre-production
Kirk Jones directed the film. Jones had not read or heard about the book, and assumed it was a novel before receiving the script. However, he then discovered that it was in fact a pregnancy guide. Although puzzled at first, he recalled his pregnancy experience as "funny, tragic, exciting" and "hilarious", and thought combining these elements would make for a "really interesting" film. Speaking about the film's theme, he stated that "everybody's experience is different" and multiple different stories "allow the audience to share in everything that is going on" and "by sharing in what's going on and seeing so many characters, there's this energy, and there's humor and there's drama in comparing all of the stories, which are taking place at the same time". What to Expect When You're Expecting stars an ensemble cast, which focuses primarily on the five couples who are going to be first-time parents. According to Access Atlanta, the project also needed "a lot of extras who are in the family way" as well as "babies with star potential". An open casting call was held on July 9, 2011. Casting director Christopher Gray said at the time, "We need a lot of pregnant women. We want the real deal". The film also featured a number of Ethiopians, for which a casting call was issued as well. Additionally, the film contains cameos by various celebrities including, Dwyane Wade, Whitney Port, and Megan Mullally.

Filming
The film began principal photography in Atlanta on July 19, 2011. On July 26, production filmed in Midtown on Peachtree Street near High Museum and in Piedmont Park. Jones said it was "tough" organizing schedules because of the number of cast members there were. Having never "shot five simultaneous stories like this", he stated: "Through necessity we had to schedule the film so that I shot everything with Jennifer Lopez in two weeks, everything with Cameron Diaz in two weeks ... because they are not available to keep flying in from another continent for two days work and then flying back again".

Music

The film's score was composed by Mark Mothersbaugh. The soundtrack also contains "Dance (Disco Heat)" performed by Sylvester, "Nobody" performed by Ne-Yo, "Shivas Regal (Theme For Gypsy)" performed by Sonny Lester & His Orchestra, "Oye Como Va" performed by Kinky, "Happening" performed by Chiddy Bang, "Kellerman's Anthem" performed by Emile Bergstein Chorale, "Get Me Golden" performed by Terraplane Sun, "Home" performed by Edward Sharpe and the Magnetic Zeros, "Don't Let Your Feet Touch Ground" performed by Ash Koley, "Weightless" performed by Natasha Bedingfield, "Forever Love" performed by Alex Ebert, "Hypnotize" performed by The Notorious B.I.G., "Comin' Home Baby" performed by Mel Tormé, "Forgetting" performed by David Gray, "Never Gonna Stop" performed by The So Manys, "Inside Out" performed by Nire' AllDai, "Waiting On The Light To Change" performed by Matthew Perryman Jones, "Addicted To Love" performed by Robert Palmer, "Modern Art" performed by Black Lips, "Don't You Want Me" performed by Phil Oakey, Philip Adrian Wright and Jo Callis, "Do What You Want" performed by Daphne Willis, "Broken Sky" performed by Rob Laufer, "Why Don't We Get Drunk" performed by Jimmy Buffett, "Put Your Hands Up" performed by The MIDI Mafia, "Samba Vocalizado" performed by Luciano Perrone, "Get It Daddy" performed by Sleeper Agent, "Now Is The Start" performed by Alison Sudol, "The Hormone Song" performed by Elizabeth Banks and "Big Poppa" performed by Ernie Isley, Marvin Isley, O'Kelly Isley, Jr., Ronald Isley, Rudolph Isley, Chris Jasper and The Notorious B.I.G.

Release
The film was released across 3,021 theaters on May 18, 2012, it closed on August 2, 2012.

Home media
What to Expect When You're Expecting was released on DVD and Blu-ray on September 11, 2012 by Lionsgate Home Entertainment.

Reception

Box office
What to Expect When You're Expecting debuted in fifth place with $10.5 million. By the end of May, the film grossed $26.4 million in the United States. In total, What to Expect When You're Expecting grossed $41.2 million domestically, for a worldwide gross of $84.4 million.

Critical response
On review aggregator website Rotten Tomatoes, the film holds an approval rating of 23% based on 136 reviews, with an average rating of 4.50/10. The site's critical consensus reads, "The cast is stocked with likable performers, but What to Expect When You're Expecting is too disjointed -- and too reliant on stock rom-com cliches -- to live up to its distinguished literary namesake." On Metacritic, the film has a weighted average score of 41 out of 100, based on 30 critics, indicating "mixed or average reviews". Audiences polled by CinemaScore gave the film an average grade of "B−" on an A+ to F scale.

Cara Nash of the Australian film magazine Filmink gave the film a mixed review, criticizing the storyline as not having "complexity" or "genuine conflict", but praised Lopez and Banks who "manage to find the humanity in their clichéd roles but they can't transcend all the surface-level schmaltz on display here". Peter Travers of Rolling Stone gave the film a negative review, stating that "the movie itself triggered the vomiting", but appreciated Rock, Kendrick and Crawford's performances "if you dramatically drop your expectations". Simon Miraudo of Quickflix called it "ill-conceived" and gave the film a mixed review while stating: "Despite an immensely appealing cast and a few funny moments, I would only recommend What to Expect at a 'push'. The eggs are there; someone just forgot to fertilise them."

Betsy Sharkey of the Los Angeles Times among other critics noted the confusion of the swiftly moving film, writing that "Rather than the engaging enlightenment of the source, the film becomes bloated by confusion." New York Daily News gave the film 3 and a half stars, writing "Thankfully the film, unlike being a parent, is a fairly smooth and entertaining ride that has a universal appeal to both parents and those who ever had a father or a mother",  and named the scene in which Jennifer Lopez's character travels to Ethiopia to meet the child she is adopting as the film's most touching moment. The Guardians Mike McCahill described the movie as "insight-deficient fluff".

Accolades

References

External links
  (archive 2017)
 
 
 
 

2012 films
2012 romantic comedy films
2010s buddy comedy films
2010s English-language films
2010s female buddy films
2010s pregnancy films
Alcon Entertainment films
American buddy comedy films
American female buddy films
American pregnancy films
American romantic comedy films
Films based on non-fiction books
Films directed by Kirk Jones
Films scored by Mark Mothersbaugh
Films set in Atlanta
Films shot in Atlanta
Lionsgate films
Phoenix Pictures films
2010s American films